Oscar Bronner (born 14 January 1943) is an Austrian newspaper publisher.

Biography 
Bronner was born in Haifa, Mandatory Palestine, on 14 January 1943. He is the eldest son of Austrian cabaret artist Gerhard Bronner. In 1948, at the age of five, he returned with his father to Austria. In 1970, Bronner launched the monthly economic journal trend and news magazine profil. In 1974, trend and profil were sold and Bronner emigrated to New York, where he lived as a painter, having several exhibitions both in Europe and the US. He returned to Vienna in 1986 and in 1988 founded the national daily newspaper Der Standard, of which he remains publisher.

In 2008, Austrian journalists Klaus Stimeder and Eva Weissenberger wrote a biography on Bronner called Trotzdem – Die Oscar Bronner Story. The book was published in English under the title Despite Everything – The Oscar Bronner Story.

On his own webpage, Bronner announces: 2009 return to painting.

In May 2014, Bronner left the board of Der Standard.

Artist 

Art historian Dieter Ronte writes about Bronner in 1985:
Oscar Bronner works in series. The series of flowers and men were followed by landscapes from early 1983 to mid-1984, which in turn preceded the portraits (Jakov Lind) and the nude paintings.

This can be easily understood from the artist's homepage

 Landscape Painting 1983
 Portrait Painting 1984
 Nude Painting 1985

Art exhibitions 
Solo exhibitions

2018  Galerie Ulysses, Vienna

2016  Galerie am Stein, Schärding

2015  Galerie Clairefontaine, Luxembourg

2015  Galerie Ulysses, Vienna

2014  tresor,  BA Kulturforum, Vienna

2013  tresor,  BA Kulturforum, Vienna

1988  Galerie Würthle, Vienna

1986  Galerie Nikki Diana Marquardt, Paris

1985  Österreichische Postsparkasse, Vienna

1984  A.M.Sachs Gallery,  New York

1982  Galerie Heike Curtze, Düsseldorf

1981  Austrian Culture Institute, New York

1980  Galerie Heike Curtze, Vienna

1980  Galerie Heike Curtze, Düsseldorf

References

External links 

1943 births
Living people
Austrian Jews
Artists from Haifa
Austrian publishers (people)
20th-century Austrian painters
Austrian male painters
21st-century Austrian painters
21st-century male artists
Austrian magazine founders
20th-century Austrian male artists